The Orca Basin is a mid-slope, silled,  mini-basin in the northern Gulf of Mexico some 300 km southwest of the Mississippi River mouth on the Louisiana continental slope. It is unique amongst the mini-basins in this area, in containing a large brine pool of anoxic salt brine. With a volume of  the pool results from the dissolution of about 3.62 billion tonnes of the Louann Salt bed into seawater. The basin owes its shape to ongoing salt tectonics and is surrounded by salt diapirs.

Gas hydrates were detected in a number of cores collected in the Orca basin during Leg 96 of the Deep Sea Drilling Program (DSDP). Hydrates were observed in the top section of Core 618-4 at 85 fbsf (26 mbsf) in gray mud and consisted of a few white crystals of a few millimeters in diameter. At Hole 618A, gas hydrates were observed in both Cores 618A-2 and 618-3 in the 62-121 fbsf (19-37 mbsf) range, with hydrates distributed throughout Core 618A-3. The hydrates ranged in size from a few millimeters to possibly a centimeter in diameter and were white.

Based on light δ13C values, the origin of the hydrate gas is biogenic. Researchers also noted that some of the hydrates appeared to occur in the sandy layers of the cores. In contrast to other gas hydrate occurrences in the Gulf of Mexico, the gas hydrate was found within a mini-basin instead of on the fractured and faulted rim of the mini-basin. It was also noted that the depth of gas hydrate occurrence coincides with the presence of black organic and/or pyrite-rich mud.

Importance of Orca Basin as a study site
The Orca Basin is important in understanding glacial and deglacial changes, including the history of meltwater flows from the Laurentide Ice Sheet, that have affected North America and the Gulf of Mexico. The sediments that fill the Orca Basin contain an important record of the paleoenvironment and paleo-oceanology of the Louisiana continental slope south of the Mississippi River Delta for at least the last 25,000 years. Because of location of this basin, paleoenvironmental proxies, e.g. planktonic foraminifers, stable isotope ratios, changes in sediment texture, and reworked calcareous nanofossils, preserved in its sediment also recorded the impact and chronology of meltwater floods that flowed down the Mississippi River on the Gulf of Mexico during the last deglaciation.

In addition, the only recorded recovery of gas hydrates in the Gulf of Mexico from depths greater than 66 fbsf (20 mbsf) occurred at DSDP Site 618 in the Orca Basin. The recovery of biogenic methane hydrate from Orca basin is also significant due to the high salinity values, which at the sediment/water interface were nearly five times as high as those found in the Red Sea (with salinity values of 240-260 PSU). The values decreased rapidly with depth to about 98 fbsf (30 mbsf) before becoming constant (48-56 PSU). The hydrate recovered from both sites in Orca Basin were in the range of 85-121 fbsf (26-37 mbsf) and are physical evidence of the decreased salinity levels. 

The Orca Basin provides an ideal setting for studying the fate of organic matter, nutrients, and metals. Examining the consumption or production of dissolved materials provides insight to how said materials mix with the seawater. With the absence of nitrate, manganese and iron oxides are more present which also leads to iron-reducing and manganese reducing bacteria being more present. The changing presence of materials at different depth of Orca Basin signifies what heterotrophic populations are present.

References

External links

Carney, Bob, Lakes Within Oceans, Ocean Explorer
 Deep Sea Drilling Program Reports and Publications – Volume 96

Anoxic waters
Gulf of Mexico
Sedimentary basins of North America